The Elmenteita agama or Elmenteita rock agama (Agama caudospinosa) is a species of lizard from the family Agamidae. The species is endemic to Kenya with the type locality being Lake Elmenteita, hence the common name.

Description
They are spiny with relatively wide tails. When "in display", the males show various shades of orange or red around their necks, chins, and chests. Females are smaller and mottled brown with a vertical line of pale spots.

References

External links
Elmenteita Agama, Herpetology of Africa

caudospinosa
Reptiles of Kenya
Agamid lizards of Africa
Reptiles described in 1910
Endemic fauna of Kenya
Taxa named by Seth Eugene Meek